"Say the Word" is a song recorded by Canadian country music artist Joel Feeney. It was released in 1993 as the first single from his second studio album, ...Life Is but a Dream. It peaked at number 5 on the RPM Country Tracks chart in January 1994.

Chart performance

Year-end charts

References

1993 songs
1993 singles
Joel Feeney songs
MCA Records singles
Songs written by Joel Feeney
Songs written by Chris Farren (country musician)
Songs written by Jeffrey Steele
Song recordings produced by Chris Farren (country musician)